The Olive Branch United Methodist Church is a historic church in Finchville, Kentucky. It was established in 1801 at Pickets Dam.  Current facility was built in 1861.

The church was added to the National Register of Historic Places in 1988.

The building appears to have been built in about 1861 and was on a circuit with the Rockbridge Church and the Methodist church in Graefenburg.  It is a brick gable-end entry church.

References

United Methodist churches in Kentucky
National Register of Historic Places in Shelby County, Kentucky
Churches completed in 1861
Churches in Shelby County, Kentucky
Churches on the National Register of Historic Places in Kentucky
1861 establishments in Kentucky
Antebellum architecture